Zhombe is a constituency of the National Assembly of the Parliament of Zimbabwe, located in Midlands Province. Its current MP since the 2018 election is Edmore Samambwa of ZANU–PF.

Members

Election results

2018

2013

2008 

 
 
 

 

 
 

Voter turnout 40.55%

Hon Roger Tazviona of Movement for Democratic Change – Tsvangirai won the Zhombe Constituency seat.

2005 

 

 
 

At the time of election in 2005, there was a total of 44,851 registered voters in Zhombe constituency. 54% voted, and of 24050 ballots cast, MDC polled 8579 and Zanu-PF polled 14750, while 721 were spoiled ballots.

2000

1995 
William Hewlett, ZANU-PF

This was the first election to be boycotted by some minority political parties in Zimbabwe since independence in 1980. However 55 of the 120 seats were not contested and ZANU-PF was the only party that fielded candidates in all the remaining 65 constituencies. 

ZANU- Ndonga won 2 seats letting ZANU-PF collect 118 over 120 seats. Margaret Dongo, a renegade from ZANU-PF, contested her defeat in a court of law and a by-election gave her the seat. At the end of the day ZANU-PF had 117 seats, ZANU-NDONGA 2 and Margaret Dongo 1.

1990

1985

See also

 Zibagwe Rural District Council

References

Midlands Province
Parliamentary constituencies in Zimbabwe